High Class Racing is a Danish auto racing team founded in the early 1990s and currently competing in the FIA World Endurance Championship and European Le Mans Series.

History 
High Class Racing was founded in the early 1990s initially competing in the Maserati Barchetta Trophy, claiming the title and becoming European Champions in the very first year of racing. The success tied the bonds as a Maserati factory team, with the aim of evolving their GT1 Le Mans project. After a sudden diagnose of Mr. De Tomaso the program was unfortunately cancelled.

Glory times with Renault Sport 
After the successful period with Maserati, High Class Racing moved on to build a relationship with Renault and was a dominant factor throughout their European Championships. In the late 1990s and early period of the new century, the team claimed titles in both the Renault Spider Cup as well as the Renault Clio V6 Trophy. Furthermore, HCR was a leading team in the Formula Renault.

Scandinavian efforts 
High Class Racing has been competing on the Scandinavian scene for more than 20 years as a top team with prominent drivers such as Tom Kristensen, Kurt Thiim, John Nielsen, Kris Nissen, Jan Magnussen and also a very young Kevin Magnussen. During this period HCR also operated as factory backed NISSAN–McDonald's Racing.

Taking it European-wide and globally 
After many great years with top drivers in national racing, High Class Racing switched back to international level competition with a move to the Renault Sport Trophy in the Renault Sport R.S. 01 in 2016. When the series folded a new chapter was however needed.

Endurance and sprint racing 

The team acquired a pair of brand new Dallara P217s and entered the European Le Mans Series in 2017 claiming an overall sixth in their first year of endurance racing, with several podium finishes on their record list. High Class Racing has been a regular entry in the ELMS ever since with a consistent driver lineup, also assisting SMP Racing in their LMP2 program in the ELMS as well as the 2017 24 Hours of Le Mans.

On the other hand, the team confirmed in 2021 a new challenge in the Fanatec GT2 European Series, a championship that forms part of the revitalised SRO's GT Sports Club concept]. The category provides a competitive outlet for the high-power models already produced by Porsche, Audi, KTM and Lamborghini and High Class Racing entered the championship with the new Audi R8 LMS GT2 which uses a 5.2-litre V10 engine designed as a naturally aspirated unit for the first time in the racing version, delivers 470 kW (640 horsepower) and, as a result, offers nearly 30 per cent more power output than in the most powerful version the Audi R8 LMS GT3 to be by far the most powerful sports car in the history of the customer racing program. 

The team added a second entry for GT2 European Series Season Finale at Paul Ricard with Dennis Andersen and David Brabham driving the brand new Brabham BT63 GT2 Concept for the first time in an official competition.

High Class Racing was crowned 2021 Fanatec GT2 European Series Champion with 5 wins, 3 Pole Position, 8 podiums & 8 fastest laps in his debut with Anders Fjordbach & Mark Patterson behind the wheel of the Audi R8 LMS GT2.

FIA World Endurance Championship and 24 Hours of Le Mans 
High Class Racing gained a late entry to the 2019 24 Hours of Le Mans. Despite the short preparation time, the team managed to finish in 11th position.

In 2019/2020, after a switch to French prototype manufacturer Oreca, High Class Racing is participating in the (full season) 2020 FIA World Endurance Championship and will furthermore enter the 2020 European Le Mans Series with a second Oreca 07.

The team confirmed later in 2020 an Oreca 07 LMP2 entry for the Rolex 24 Hours of Daytona, which took place on 30–31 January 2021 and then some weeks later former Formula 1 driver and four time 24 Hours of Le Mans winner Jan Magnussen joined High Class Racing regulars Anders Fjordbach and Dennis Andersen as first drivers confirmed for the 2021 FIA World Endurance Championship season. High Class Racing announced a second LMP2-entry ahead of the 2021 24h of Le Mans with Kevin Magnussen as the lead driver.  joining his father Jan and Anders Fjordbach in car #49.

After a decent start of 2021 season at 6 Hours of Spa-Francorchamps, the team scored its first-ever WEC podium after finishing P3 in LMP2 ProAm class during 8 Hours of Portimao.

High Class Racing run an academy for determined, young open wheel and endurance hopefuls, and have international level junior drivers in Formula 4 as well as touring cars.

Rolex 24 at Daytona 
After confirm the debut in 2021 Rolex 24 Hours of Daytona, the team confirmed their driver lineup that will be led by former Formula 1 driver and Canadian Grand Prix winner Robert Kubica, who is currently contracted by Alfa Romeo Racing ORLEN as reserve driver. Kubica will be joined by Austrian DTM-star Ferdinand Habsburg, who completes the strong lineup with High Class Racing regulars Anders Fjordbach and Dennis Andersen.

Racing record

24 Hours of Le Mans results 
(key) (Races in bold indicate pole position; races in italics indicate fastest lap)

Rolex 24 at Daytona results

World Endurance Championship results 

* Anders Fjordbach and Jan Magnussen didn't race with this car in 2021 24 Hours of Le Mans. Anders still sharing the #20 Oreca 07-Gibson with Dennis Andersen for the rest of the season

** Robert Kubica joined the team for season finale double-header in Bahrain replacing Jan Magnussen

World Endurance Championship LMP2 Pro/Am results 

* Anders Fjordbach and Jan Magnussen didn't race with this car in 2021 24 Hours of Le Mans. Anders still sharing the #20 Oreca 07-Gibson with Dennis Andersen for the rest of the season

** Robert Kubica joined the team for season finale double-header in Bahrain replacing Jan Magnussen

IMSA SportsCar Championship results 

** MEC - Michelin Endurance Cup.

‡ Points only awarded towards Michelin Endurance Cup championship

Fanatec GT2 European Series results - ProAm Class

Asian Le Mans Series results

European Le Mans Series results

References

24 Hours of Le Mans teams
European Le Mans Series teams
Danish auto racing teams
FIA World Endurance Championship teams
WeatherTech SportsCar Championship teams
Audi in motorsport
Auto racing teams established in 1990